Adolphus Hitchcock Tanner (May 23, 1833 – January 14, 1882) was a U.S. Representative from New York.

Biography
Born in Granville, Washington County, New York, Tanner completed preparatory studies.  He studied law, and was admitted to the bar in 1854 and commenced practice in Whitehall, New York.

During the Civil War, Tanner entered the Union Army in 1862 as a captain in command of Company C, 123rd New York Volunteer Infantry Regiment.  He was promoted through the ranks, and was the regiment's lieutenant colonel and second in command at the close of the war.

Tanner was elected as a Republican to the Forty-first Congress (March 4, 1869 – March 3, 1871).  He resumed the practice of law in Whitehall, and died there on January 14, 1882.  He was interred in Evergreen Cemetery, Salem, New York.

References
 Retrieved on 2009-05-01

Reminiscences of the 123d Regiment, N.Y.S.V by  Henry C. Morhous

1833 births
1882 deaths
People of New York (state) in the American Civil War
New York (state) lawyers
People from Granville, New York
Union Army officers
Republican Party members of the United States House of Representatives from New York (state)
People from Whitehall, New York
19th-century American politicians
19th-century American lawyers